Joe Berger is an illustrator and cartoonist from Bristol.

He has been making films, illustrating and cartooning since 1991. In 1992 he drew his own British small press comics Shooba heavily influenced by underground cartoonist Robert Crumb. These were autobiographical strips and a surreal strip Drift Dream with a tank rolling down the street same as Ingmar Bergman's The Silence.

He drew The Slap of Doom in Psychopia.

In 1993 he drew The Artist with writer Mike Von Joel a picture book about how a talentless Neo-conceptual art student makes it big in the art world similar to Young British Artists Damien Hirst. It has recently been republished.

He often works with writer/sound magician Pascal Wyse. Every Friday Since 2003, Berger and Wyse have produced  The Pitchers comic strip in The Guardian.  It is about the madness of Hollywood seen through the eyes of a pair of scriptwriters.

He is currently working on his first children's book Bridget Fidget.

He also plays shortstop for the Bangers, a coed softball team based in Mesa, Arizona.

Works
Illustrations
Whip Your Life into Shape 2005 a self-help book
How to Change Your Life the Guardian G2 cover 2005
Bloggers Guide the Guardian travel cover 2005

Book Covers
My Latest Grievance Elinor Lipman Headline 2006
The Pitch by Eileen Quinn and Judy Counihan Faber 2006
The Apologist by Jay Rayner Atlantic Books 2004
The Hamster that liked Puccini by Simon Hoggart Atlantic Books/Guardian Books 2005

References and notes

External links
 
A biog on Berger's animations
 

English cartoonists
Living people
British small press comics
British comics artists
1965 births